Wildwood is a small unincorporated community centered on the Wildwood Road, just west of the Morehead City town limits, along US Highway 70, in Carteret County, North Carolina, United States. Newport is the next closest town.

Community 
The larger region encompassed by the Wildwood fire district is also sometimes referred to as "Wildwood" by local residents, and contains about 5000 residents.  The Wildood Fire Department merged with the Morehead City Fire & EMS on October 1, 2014. The Wildwood Presbyterian Church, located on the Wildwood Road, has been in existence since the 1890s. The Wildwood Community Cemetery contains graves dating to American Civil War times, and is accessible via Old Murdoch Road. Wildwood was the home of Jake Wade, baseball pitcher in the 1930s and 1940s. He died on February 1, 2006, at his home in Wildwood at the age of 93.

Local government 
Wildwood is located in District 3 for the Carteret County Board of Commissioners. As of March 2015, Wildwood was represented on the Board by Terry Frank, whose term was due to expire in November 2016.
District 3 also includes part of Morehead City as well as Broad Creek.

References

External links
 Google Maps: Wildwood, North Carolina
 Carteret County Commissioners
 Jake Wade Biography on HistoricBaseball.com
 Wildwood FD to Become Part of Morehead City Fire-EMS
 Wildwood Presbyterian Church website
 Findagrave.com: Wildwood Community Cemetery

Unincorporated communities in North Carolina
Unincorporated communities in Carteret County, North Carolina